Absolutely may refer to:
 Absolutely (Boxer album), the second rock music album recorded by the band Boxer
 Absolutely (Madness album), the 1980 second album from the British ska band Madness
 Absolutely (ABC album), a comprehensive greatest hits package released in 1990 by the band ABC
 Absolutely (Eurogliders album), the third studio album by Australian Indie pop, rock band Eurogliders
 "Absolutely" (Eurogliders song), a song from the aforementioned album.
 Absolutely (Rik Emmett album), the debut solo album by the Canadian rock guitarist Rik Emmett
 Absolutely (Sister Hazel album), Sister Hazel's sixth studio album
 "Absolutely (Story of a Girl)", a 2000 song by Nine Days
 Absolutely (TV series), a British comedy sketch show
 Abso Lutely Productions, a production company started by Tim Heidecker and Eric Wareheim

See also
 Absolute (disambiguation)
 Absoluteness, a description of formulas that have the same truth value in each of some class of structures
 Absolution (disambiguation)

 Definitely (disambiguation)
 Maybe (disambiguation)
 Possibly (disambiguation)